Barbara Olmsted (born August 17, 1959) is a Canadian sprint kayaker who competed in the 1980s. Competing in two Summer Olympics (1984 Los Angeles and 1988 Seoul), she won a bronze medal in the K-4 500 m event at Los Angeles in 1984. Olmsted was born in North Bay, Ontario. She received her Bachelor of Arts, Bachelor of Physical Education and Bachelor of Education degrees from Queen's University, Master of Arts degree from the University of Western Ontario, and Doctor of Education degree from West Virginia University.

References
Barbara Olmsted's profile at Sports Reference.com

1959 births
Living people
Canadian female canoeists
Canoeists at the 1984 Summer Olympics
Canoeists at the 1988 Summer Olympics
Olympic canoeists of Canada
Olympic bronze medalists for Canada
Sportspeople from North Bay, Ontario
Academic staff of Nipissing University
Queen's University at Kingston alumni
University of Western Ontario alumni
West Virginia University alumni
Olympic medalists in canoeing
Medalists at the 1984 Summer Olympics